Marie-Aimée Lebreton is a French writer. She was born in Bouïra, Kabylie, in 1962. She obtained a PhD in the philosophy of art and studied at the Conservatoire de Paris. She teaches at the University of Lorraine and lives in Paris.

Her first book was published in 2005 by Editions Pleins Feux. It was titled How Clémentine, Who is Deaf, Became a Musician, and had a preface by Sylviane Agacinski. Cent sept ans, her first novel, won the Prix Alain Fournier. Her 2020 novel Jacques et la corvée de bois deals with the absurdity of the Algerian war.

References

French writers
1962 births
Living people
Academic staff of the University of Lorraine
People from Bouïra
Writers from Paris